Buchanan Smithy is a hamlet in Buchanan in the far west of Stirling, Scotland. The current settlement was mostly purpose-built in the 18th century for the estate workers of James Graham, 3rd Duke of Montrose, who lived at nearby Buchanan Castle.  The name "Smithy" arose due to the presence of three blacksmiths there. Today the main local industries are forestry, agriculture and tourism.

See also
 Balmaha
 Milton of Buchanan

External links

 Buchanan Community Profile
 Details of the surrounding area

Hamlets in Stirling (council area)